In 1889; Pichancourt (first name is not known) developed the L'Oiseau Mechanique (Mechanical Bird) which aimed to imitate the motion of a bird's wings in flight.

References
 Chanute, Octave, Progress in Flying Machines, Dover, 1894 (reprinted 1998), 

19th-century French inventors